Valeri Astemirovich Basiyev (born 2 June 1985) is a Russian former professional football player.

Club career
He played in the Russian Football National League for FC SKA-Energiya Khabarovsk in 2012.

External links
 
 

1985 births
Living people
Russian footballers
Association football forwards
FC Sheksna Cherepovets players
FC Dynamo Stavropol players
FC SKA-Khabarovsk players
FC Vityaz Podolsk players
FC SKA Rostov-on-Don players